Douglas Hamilton was a British Indian Army officer.

Douglas Hamilton may also refer to:

Douglas Hamilton, 8th Duke of Hamilton (1756–1799), Scottish peer
Douglas Hamilton (journalist) (1947–2012), Canadian/British Reuters foreign correspondent
Dougie Hamilton (born 1993), Canadian ice hockey defenseman

See also
Doug Hamilton (disambiguation)
Douglas Douglas-Hamilton (disambiguation)
Douglas-Hamilton, surname